The 1965 European Baseball Championship was held in Madrid (Spain), at La Elipa field (August 29 to September 5) and was won by the Netherlands for the seventh time in a row. Italy finished second and Germany (FRG) took the third place after defeating Spain for the first time. Sweden closed the table.

References
(NL) European Championship Archive at honkbalsite

European Baseball Championship
European Baseball Championship
1965
1965 in Spanish sport